The 2019 Liga 3 Central Java is the third edition of Liga 3 (formerly known as Liga Nusantara) Central Java as a qualifying round for the national round of 2019 Liga 3. PSIP Pemalang, winner of the 2018 Liga 3 Central Java are the defending champions. The competition began on 14 July 2018.

Format
In this competition, 20 teams are divided into 4 groups of four or five. The two best teams are through to knockout stage. The winner will represent Central Java in the national round of 2019 Liga 3.

Teams
There are 20 clubs which will participate the league in this season.

Group stage
This stage started on 14 July 2019.

Group A

Group B

Group C

Group D

Knockout stage

References

2019 in Indonesian football
Sport in Central Java